Pierre Png Tiang Huat (born 29 October 1973), is a Singaporean actor and comedian. He is known for starring in multiple Singaporean MediaCorp's Channel 5 and Channel 8's dramas which include The Gentlemen and When Duty Calls.

Early in his career, he was known for playing the comedic role of Phua Chu Beng in the long-running sitcom Phua Chu Kang Pte Ltd. He is also known for his role as a troubled and unhappy husband in the 2008 year-end blockbuster period drama The Little Nyonya, and as a villain in 2013 drama The Journey: A Voyage. In 2018, he appeared in the Hollywood film Crazy Rich Asians.

Early life
Png was born on 29 October 1973 in Singapore, and was educated at St Gabriel's Primary School and Holy Innocents' High School.

Career
Png first encountered acting shortly after National Service in his role in the 1998 film Forever Fever. The role piqued his interest in acting, and he enrolled in an acting course. The same year, Png won the Channel 5 talent competition The Fame Awards. Png made his television debut on Phua Chu Kang Pte Ltd, and starred in several other Channel 5 productions. He later began acting in Chinese language dramas on Channel 8 and was nominated for the Most Popular Newcomer Award at the 2001 Star Awards. In 2006 he received his first Best Actor award nomination at the Star Awards 2006 for his role in The Shining Star. Png won the coveted award on his fourth nomination in 2014 for his vicious role Hei Long in MediaCorp's year-end mega-blockbuster The Journey: A Voyage. In 2014, he snared a leading role in the Channel 5 blockbuster drama Zero Calling and clinched the "Best Actor" award at the 19th Asian Television Awards (ATA). He co-starred in the Warner Bros. film Crazy Rich Asians, with Constance Wu and Henry Golding. The film marked his Hollywood feature film debut.

Personal life
Png has been married to former actress Andrea De Cruz since 2003. Png and De Cruz met and began dating in 1999. The relationship was made public after De Cruz suffered from liver failure due to consumption of Slim 10 pills, and Png donated half his liver to her. Under medical advice associated with the liver transplant, the couple does not have children.

Filmography

Film

Television

Awards and nominations

References

External links
 
 Pierre Png profile on The Celebrity Agency

Living people
Peranakan people in Singapore
Singaporean television personalities
Singaporean male television actors
Singaporean male film actors
20th-century Singaporean male actors
21st-century Singaporean male actors
1973 births